Bárbara Sofia Holanda Bandeira (born 23 June 2001, in Azeitão) is a Portuguese pop singer. She is the youngest daughter of the Portuguese singer Rui Bandeira, who represented Portugal at the Eurovision Song Contest 1999.

Career 

In 2011, she participated on the 4th season of Uma Canção para Ti, a Portuguese talent show for kids, and ended up being a semi-finalist. Later, in 2014 and only 13 years old she participated on The Voice Kids Portugal, she eventually chose Anselmo Ralph as a mentor and ended up being eliminated on the live shows.

In 2017, her song "És Tu" was part of the soundtrack of the Portuguese telenovela Espelho d'Água.

On 3 July 2022, it was announced that Bandeira would be a coach on The Voice Gerações alongside Mickael Carreira, Simone de Oliveira, and her former coach, Anselmo Ralph. The spin-off is the Generations version of The Voice and took take place eight years after she participated on The Voice Kids.

Awards and nominations

Discography

Albums

Singles

Notes 

Living people
2001 births
Portuguese pop singers
21st-century Portuguese women singers
The Voice of Portugal contestants
People from Setúbal
Golden Globes (Portugal) winners